Deportivo Garcilaso is a Peruvian football club, playing in the city of Cusco, Peru. The club was founded in 1957 and plays in the Peruvian league.

Garcilaso plays the derby of the city of Cusco against Cienciano. The two clubs split the majority of preferences among the population of Cusco.

History
In the 2000 Copa Perú, the club classified to the National Stage, but was eliminated by Coronel Bolognesi in the Quarterfinals.

In the 2003 Copa Perú, the club classified to the National Stage, but was eliminated by Deportivo Enersur in the Quarterfinals.

In the 2007 Copa Perú, the club classified to the National Stage, but was eliminated by Unión Minas (Orcopampa) in the Round of 16.

Rivalries
Deportivo Garcilaso has had a long-standing rivalry with local club Cienciano. Upstart Real Garcilaso, founded in 2009, has outperformed Deportivo in recent years and now plays in the Peruvian Primera Division. All three clubs share the same home stadium, Estadio Garcilaso.

Stadium

Deportivo Garcilaso play their home games in Estadio Garcilaso de la Vega in downtown Cusco. It was named after the Peruvian Inca Garcilaso de la Vega. When first inaugurated in 1950, it had a spectator capacity of 22,000 and had a running track. In 2004, the stadium's capacity was expanded to 42,000, losing its running track, because of Cienciano's success in international tournaments and it would be a venue in the Copa America 2004.

Honours

National
Copa Perú:
Winners (1): 2022

Regional
Región VII:
Winners (2): 2000, 2003
Runner-up (2): 1998, 2001

Región VIII:
Winners (1): 2007

Liga Departamental del Cusco:
Winners (23): 1968, 1969, 1974, 1975, 1978, 1979, 1980. 1981, 1990, 1996, 1998, 2000, 2001, 2003, 2004, 2005, 2007, 2008, 2016, 2017, 2018, 2019, 2022
Runner-up (3): 2004, 2009, 2015

Liga Provincial del Cusco:
Winners (7): 2011, 2012, 2014, 2016, 2018, 2019, 2022
Runner-up (2): 2013, 2015

Liga Distrital del Cusco:
Winners (6): 2008, 2009, 2011, 2012, 2014, 2018
Runner-up (4): 2010, 2013, 2015, 2022

See also
List of football clubs in Peru
Peruvian football league system

External links
 Official Website

Deportivo Garcilaso
Association football clubs established in 1957
Deportivo Garcilaso